Napoleon Bill Harris, III (born February 25, 1979) is an American politician and former American football linebacker who has been a member of the Illinois Senate representing the 15th district since 2013. The 15th district stretches from Blue Island in the north, Calumet City in the east, Homewood in the west, Steger in the south, and includes all or parts of Crete-Monee, Dolton, Flossmoor, Glenwood, Thornton, Dixmoor, Markham, Midlothian, Oak Forest, Harvey, Riverdale, and South Holland.

Prior to his service in the Illinois Senate, he was a linebacker in the National Football League for a total of seven seasons with the Oakland Raiders, the Minnesota Vikings, and Kansas City Chiefs at various times.

Early life
Harris grew up in Dixmoor, Illinois. He attended Lincoln Elementary School, Rosa L. Parks Middle School, and Thornton Township High School. He was a tri-star athlete and honor student. His father died his junior year of high school.

Harris was an honors student at Thornton Township High School in Harvey, Illinois and lettered in football and basketball. In football, he posted 23 sacks, 98 tackles, two fumble recoveries, 1 forced fumble, two safeties, and one interception and was named the Defensive Player of the Year by the Chicago Tribune, Chicago Sun-Times, Star Publications, Daily Southtown, and the Hammond Times. Napoleon also averaged 18 points and 10 rebounds on the No. 1 basketball team in the country.

Harris enrolled at Northwestern University, where he played college football for the Northwestern Wildcats. For one year, he was a two sport athlete playing basketball. His complete college career ranked 11th on Northwestern's all-time tackles list with 334. All-Big Ten Conference as a senior after starting all 11 games at defensive end after moving from outside linebacker and ranked fourth on team in tackles with 78.

NFL career

Harris was drafted in the first round of the 2002 draft by the Oakland Raiders, the 23rd overall pick. That year, he started 13 of 16 regular-season games, all three playoff games, and Super Bowl XXXVII for the Oakland Raiders and was named to the Pro Football Weekly All-Rookie team.

In 2005, Harris was acquired by the Minnesota Vikings as part of blockbuster trade which sent Randy Moss to Oakland for the seventh overall pick and a seventh-round pick in the 2005 NFL Draft. The Vikings used the picks to select wide receiver Troy Williamson and cornerback Adrian Ward. Despite being traded for one of the premier players in the National Football League, Harris did not immediately live up to his potential the following season with the Minnesota Vikings. In that first season with the Vikings, he was hampered with a lingering knee injury and saw limited playing time. However, in the second season he finished second on the team with 96 tackles, 3 interceptions, 3.5 sacks and 2 fumble recoveries in 14 games.

On March 6, 2007, Harris agreed to a six-year deal with the Kansas City Chiefs. The Chiefs released Harris on October 14, 2008. Just two days after his release from the Chiefs, Harris re-joined the Minnesota Vikings on October 16. Harris started in 5 of the 10 games he played and finished his second stint with the Vikings with 32 tackles and 1 sack, and also scored his first NFL touchdown after returning a fumble 27 yards in week 12 in Jacksonville. Despite a fairly good performance, the Vikings did not hold on to him.

In May 2008, Napoleon appeared on The CW Network series The Game. Harris signed a one-year contract with the Oakland Raiders on August 24, 2009 after the team released cornerback Ricky Manning, but was released five days later.

NFL statistics

Source: ESPN. Abbreviations key:

 GP: games played
 COMB: combined tackles
 TOTAL: total tackles
 AST: assisted tackles
 SACK: sacks

 FF: forced fumbles
 FR: fumble recoveries
 FR YDS: fumble return yards 
 INT: interceptions
 IR YDS: interception return yards

 AVG IR: average interception return
 LNG: longest interception return
 TD: interceptions returned for touchdown
 PD: passes defensed

Personal life
Harris is married with two children. After leaving the NFL, Harris, his wife, and sons where he became the owner of two Beggars Pizza locations.

Illinois Senate
In 2011, after Illinois State Senator James Meeks announced his retirement, Harris chose to run to succeed him in the 15th district on a platform of creating economic growth for the district. He won the 2012 primary with a plurality of the vote against two opponents, and ran in the general election unopposed.

As of July 2022, Senator Harris is a member of the following Illinois Senate committees:

 (Chairman of) Appropriations - Personnel and Procurement Committee (SAPP-SAPP)
 Appropriations - Revenue and Finance Committee (SAPP-SARF)
 Appropriations - Government Infrastructure Committee (SAPP-SAGI)
 Appropriations Committee (SAPP)
 Commerce Committee (SCOM)
 (Co-chairman of) Critical Energy Infrastructure and Grid Reliability (SENE-ECEI)
 Energy and Public Utilities Committee (SENE)
 Executive Committee (SEXC)
 Executive - Cannabis Committee (SEXC-SEOC)
 (Chairman of) Executive - Tobacco Committee (SEXC-STOB)
 Health Committee (SHEA)
 (Chairman of) Insurance Committee (SINS)
 Pensions Committee (SPEN)
 (Chairman of) Redistricting - South Cook County (SRED)
 Subcommittee on Public Health (SHEA-SHPH)

While a member of the Illinois Senate, Harris has run for higher office on two occasions. In 2013, Harris ran for the congressional seat vacated by Jesse Jackson Jr., but dropped out after two months, endorsing Robin Kelly. In 2015, he announced his candidacy in the Democratic primary for U.S. Senate in 2016. He would come in third place, losing to Tammy Duckworth, who would go on to win the general election.

After the death of longtime Thornton Township Democratic Committeeman Frank Zuccarelli, Harris defeated State Representative Thaddeus Jones for the position.

Electoral history

References

External links
Illinois Senate
Biography, bills and committees at the 98th Illinois General Assembly
By session: 98th
Illinois State Senator Napoleon B. Harris III legislative website
 Senator Napoleon Harris at Illinois Senate Democrats
 

Football
Northwestern Wildcats bio 
Oakland Raiders bio 

1979 births
Living people
Politicians from Chicago
Players of American football from Illinois
African-American basketball players
American football linebackers
American football defensive ends
Basketball players from Chicago
African-American state legislators in Illinois
Democratic Party Illinois state senators
Members of the Church of God in Christ
Northwestern Wildcats men's basketball players
Northwestern Wildcats football players
Oakland Raiders players
Minnesota Vikings players
Kansas City Chiefs players
American athlete-politicians
Baptists from Illinois
21st-century American politicians
People from Flossmoor, Illinois
American men's basketball players